Protein phosphatase with EF-hand domain 2 is a protein that in humans is encoded by the PPEF2 gene.

Function

This gene encodes a member of the serine/threonine protein phosphatase with EF-hand motif family. The protein contains a protein phosphatase catalytic domain, and at least two EF-hand calcium-binding motifs in its C terminus. Although its substrate(s) is unknown, the encoded protein, which is expressed specifically in photoreceptors and the pineal, has been suggested to play a role in the visual system. This gene shares high sequence similarity with the Drosophila retinal degeneration C (rdgC) gene. [provided by RefSeq, Jul 2008].

References

Further reading